"Lose It" is a song co-written and recorded by American country music singer Kane Brown. It is the lead single to his second major-label album Experiment. Brown wrote the song with Chase McGill and Will Weatherly.

Content
Brown said of the song, "I fell in love with this song, it was really exciting, it was really uptempo. It’s one of my favorite songs, so I hope you enjoy it." Brown officially released the single in June 2018, following an Instagram post he made in March that featured him dancing to the song's chorus with his dog. He also noted that the song was an example of wanting to bring new sounds to his music, highlighting in particular that it is his first song to contain a fiddle. The song is about the emotions felt around the narrator's lover, saying that he "lose[s] it" in her presence. Of the lyrics, The Boot writer Liv Stecker said that "the first verse launches, coaching a romantic prospect to offload distractions. The lyrical theme switches in the chorus, as Brown admits that he's the one losing it, when she's all in."

The song's video features Brown performing in the desert.

Commercial performance
As of January 2019, the song has sold 194,000 copies in the US. On March 15, 2019, the single was certified platinum by the Recording Industry Association of America (RIAA) for combined sales and streaming equivalent units of over a million units in the United States.

Charts

Weekly charts

Year-end charts

Certifications

References

2018 songs
2018 singles
Kane Brown songs
RCA Records Nashville singles
Song recordings produced by Dann Huff
Songs written by Kane Brown
Songs written by Chase McGill